Cyperus microbolbos is a species of sedge that is found in northeastern Africa.

The species was first formally described by the botanist Charles Baron Clarke in 1901.

See also
 List of Cyperus species

References

microbolbos
Taxa named by Charles Baron Clarke
Plants described in 1901
Flora of Sudan
Flora of Eritrea